Funerus is an American death metal band from Johnstown, Pennsylvania, that was originally formed in 1990. The band is a current death metal side project of John McEntee of Incantation and his now ex-wife Jill. Funerus has released two full-length studio albums on Ibex Moon Records.

Members 
 Jill McEntee – Bass (1993–1994, 2002–present), Lead Vocals (2004–present)
 John McEntee – Guitar (2002–present)
 Barry Mull – Guitar (2015–present)
 Pat Carroll – Drums (2015–present)

Former members 
 Jason Foust – Drums (1990–1994)
 Brad Heiple – Lead Vocals, Guitars (1990–1994; 2002–2004), Bass (1990–1993)
 Kyle Severn – Drums (2002–2009)
 Sam Inzerra – Drums (2009–2014)

Discography

Demos
 Utter Dismemberment (1991)       
 Dismembered Again... (1992)       
 Rehearsal Demo #3 (1994)

EPs
 The Black Death (2015)

Studio albums 
 Festering Earth (2003)
 Reduced to Sludge (2011)

References

External links
 
 Funerus on Facebook

Musical groups established in 1990
American death metal musical groups
Heavy metal musical groups from Pennsylvania
Musical groups from Pennsylvania
American musical trios